Herdoniini is a tribe of plant bugs in the family Miridae. There are about eight genera and more than thirty described species in Herdoniini.

Genera
These eight genera belong to the tribe Herdoniini:
 Barberiella Poppius, 1914
 Closterocoris Uhler, 1890
 Cyphopelta Van Duzee, 1910
 Dacerla Signoret, 1881
 Heidemanniella Poppius, 1914
 Mexicomiris Carvalho & Schaffner, 1974
 Paradacerla Carvalho & Usinger, 1957
 Paraxenetus Reuter, 1907

References

Further reading

External links

 

 
Hemiptera tribes
Mirinae
Articles created by Qbugbot